Mount Gass is a mountain located on the boundary of Alberta and British Columbia on the Continental Divide and is part of the Rocky Mountain chain. It was named in 1928 after Lieutenant Lawrence Henderson Gass.Gass was killed in action on April 8, 1917 during WWI while serving with the Canadian Garrison Artillery. Before the war, Gass was employed with the Geological Survey of Canada, and worked on surveys of the British Columbia's railway belt during the seasons of 1913, 1914 and 1915.

In 1948, King Bearpaw, a Stoney Indian, and Bill Watt went prospecting on the mountain, specifically on the eastern peak where they had seen unusual looking rocks. They later discovered lead ore, silver, zinc, and a small amount of gold.

See also
List of peaks on the British Columbia–Alberta border

References

Two-thousanders of Alberta
Two-thousanders of British Columbia
Canadian Rockies